Sceptre is a special service area in the Canadian province of Saskatchewan within the Rural Municipality of Clinworth No. 230 and Census Division No. 8. It held village status between 1913 and 2022.

History 
Sceptre incorporated as a village on April 30, 1913. It restructured on January 1, 2023, relinquishing its village status in favour of becoming a special service area under the jurisdiction of the Rural Municipality of Clinworth No. 230.

Demographics 

Arts and culture 
Sceptre is home to various works of public art, including cartoon-like fire hydrants, murals, and the world's largest metal wheat sculpture.

The former school was reopened in 1988 as the Great Sandhills Museum, with exhibits showcasing the area's natural and human history.

Attractions 
Sceptre is north of the Great Sand Hills, a vast area of arid grassland and sand dunes. Though located on private land, the public is permitted to enter the area.

Notable people 

 Bert Olmstead (1926–2015), ice hockey left winger and five-time Stanley Cup winner
 Jimmy Shields (1909–1996), curler and racehorse owner
 Harry Whiteside (1909–1984), former member of Parliament for Swift Current

References 

Villages in Saskatchewan
Clinworth No. 230, Saskatchewan
Division No. 8, Saskatchewan